"Simon Turner" is the debut album of the singer and later film soundtrack composer Simon Fisher Turner. It was released in 1973 on UK Records. At the time Turner was being widely promoted in the UK pop press as a homegrown alternative to David Cassidy. The album featured a combination of covers, including David Bowie's "The Prettiest Star", and original songs mainly written by the producer Jonathan King.

Track listing

Side One
 "Wild Thing"
 "17"
 "She's a Lady"
 "Look at Me Girl"
 "Since I Don't Have You"
 "Love Around"

Side Two
 "The Prettiest Star"
 "Do You Know What I Mean"
 "Sign on the Dotted Line"
 "Sit Down, I Think I Love You"
 "Shoeshine Boy"
 "A Long Time Ago"

References

External links

 Youtube: Love Around

1973 debut albums